Kaliyuva Mane is an informal school for underprivileged children located at Mysore in Karnataka, India.

History
Kaliyuva Mane was established in 2005 by a non for profit foundation called Divya Deepa Charitable Trust based in Mysore.  The present Managing Trustee of the organization is Mr. M.R. Ananth Kumar, a social activist and lifetime volunteer.

The first school was set up in 1999 in Kenchalagudu village. It morphed into a full residential school in 2020.

Location
The school is located on the Mysore - Mananthavady highway.

Facilities
The school is set in a  farmland adjacent to the Mananthavady Road in Mysore city. There are five innovative learning areas, one auditorium, one science laboratory and one small library.  There are separate dormitories for boys and girls.  A modern kitchen equipped with Gobar gas, Astra stove and LPG gas makes hygienic and nutritious food for the children and the volunteer-teachers.

Farm-like environment
The school has a farm-like environment so that children can learn from nature.  The water source is a tube well.  The campus has rain water harvesting facility.  Half an acre of the campus is earmarked as a playground. There is a small dairy farm that provides milk for the campus.  An eco-farm called Vanasuma imparts environmental education.  Power is generated by a 15 KVA three-phase diesel generator.

Methodology
The school follows an informal way of teaching.

See also
 Divya Deepa Charitable Trust
 Kenchalagudu

References

Non-profit organisations based in India
Schools in Mysore
Organisations based in Mysore
Educational institutions established in 2005
2005 establishments in Karnataka